Santa Luzia is Portuguese for Saint Lucia, and may refer to any of the following:

Places

Brazil
 Santa Luzia, Bahia, a municipality in the State of Bahia
 Santa Luzia, Maranhão, a municipality in the State of Maranhão
 Santa Luzia, Minas Gerais, a municipality in the State of Minas Gerais
 Santa Luzia, Paraíba, a municipality in the State of Paraíba
 Santa Luzia d'Oeste, a municipality in the State of Rondônia
 Santa Luzia do Paruá, a municipality in the State of Maranhão

Cape Verde
 Santa Luzia, Cape Verde, an uninhabited island of the Barlavento chain

Portugal
 Santa Luzia (Ourique), a civil parish in the municipality of Ourique
 Santa Luzia (Tavira), a civil parish in the municipality of Tavira

Azores
 Santa Luzia (Angra do Heroísmo), a civil parish in the municipality of Angra do Heroísmo, Terceira
 Santa Luzia (São Roque do Pico), a civil parish in the municipality of São Roque do Pico, Pico

Madeira
 Santa Luzia (Funchal), a civil parish in the municipality of Funchal

See also
 Luzia (disambiguation)